Amphipholis squamata, common names brooding snake star and dwarf brittle star, is a species complex of brittle stars in the family Amphiuridae.

Description

This species is small, grey to bluish-white, and phosphorescent. It has thin, short arms around 20 mm long. The round disc is 3 to 5mm, and has a scale covering with D-shaped radial plates. It has rhombic-shaped mouth shields and extremely wide mouth papillae.

Distribution
Amphipholis Squamata is found in all parts of the British Isles and also in Ireland. It has been recorded in many other parts of the world and molecular studies have shown that there are multiple species in this complex.

Habitat
This brittle star lives in the intertidal zone in shallow water, and can be found under large stones, shells, and around sessile invertebrates such as bryozoans.

Parasites
This brittle star hosts at least two species of ectoparasites. The following two that have been confirmed are both copepods:
Cancerilla tubulata Dalyell, 1851
Parachordeumium amphiurae (Hérouard, 1906)

Synonyms

Asterias noctiluca Viviani, 1805
Ophiura elegans Leach, 1815 [suppressed]
Amphiura elegans (Leach, 1815)
Asterias squamata Delle Chiaje, 1828
Amphioplus squamata (Delle Chiaje, 1828)
Amphiura squamata (Delle Chiaje, 1828)
Axiognathus squamata (Delle Chiaje, 1828)
Amphiura neglecta Forbes, 1843
Ophiolepis tenuis Ayres, 1854
Amphiura tenera Lütken, 1856
Amphipholis tenera (Lütken, 1856)
Amphiura tenuispina Ljungman, 1865
Amphipholis tenuispina (Ljungman, 1865)
Amphipholis squamata tenuispina (Ljungman, 1865)
Amphipholis appressa Ljungman, 1872
Amphipholis kinbergi Ljungman, 1872
Amphipholis lineata Ljungman, 1872
Amphipholis patagonica Ljungman, 1872
Amphiura parva Hutton, 1878
Amphipholis australiana H.L. Clark, 1909
Ophiactis minor Döderlein, 1910
Amphipholis minor (Döderlein, 1910)
Amphipholis japonica Matsumoto, 1915
Amphipholis tissieri Reys, 1961

References

Amphiuridae
Animals described in 1829